Pluteo 29.1, also known as Pluteus 29.1, or simply the Florence Manuscript, is an illuminated manuscript in the Laurentian Library of Florence.

The manuscript is believed to have been produced by the workshop of Johannes Grusch in Paris during the mid-thirteenth century, probably between 1245 and 1255. It contains the largest extant collection of music in the Notre-Dame style, mainly organa, conductus, and motets. The illumination consists of thirteen historiated initials and one full-page miniature which serves as its frontispiece.

The manuscript was issued in facsimile by Institute of Medieval Music in 1967.

See also 
Squarcialupi Codex

References

Further reading 

 Facsimile reproduction of the manuscript Firenze, Biblioteca mediceo-laurenziana, Pluteo 29, edited by Luther Dittmer. Publications of Mediaeval Musical Manuscripts, no. 10–11. Brooklyn: Institute of Mediaeval Music, 1966–67.
 Masani Ricci, Massimo. Codice Pluteo 29.1 della Biblioteca Laurenziana di Firenze: storia e catalogo comparato. Pisa: Edizioni ETS, 2002.

External links 
 Reproduction of the manuscript: http://mss.bmlonline.it/s.aspx?Id=AWOHy_N-I1A4r7GxMB57&c=Antiphonarium#/book

13th-century books
13th-century illuminated manuscripts
Music illuminated manuscripts
Medieval music manuscript sources
French music